Dragovic, Dragović or Dragovič  may refer to:

People
 Dragović (surname), a South Slavic surname

Places
Dragovič, Juršinci, a village in Slovenia
Dragović, Pakrac, a village in Croatia
Dragović Monastery, a monastery in Croatia

See also
Dragovich (disambiguation)
Dragovići (disambiguation)
Drago (disambiguation)